Hector Quiñones (born 17 March 1992), known as Quiño, is a Colombian football defender who plays for América de Cali.

Club

Early career 
Hector was part of the youth academy of Deportivo Cali. After making his debut in 2010, he played with them for a single season where they won the Copa Colombia in his debut year. Eventually, he transferred to Junior de Barranquilla where he became a stand out, attracting foreign scouts. Which led to being signed by F.C. Porto during the winter transfer in 2012.

Porto
For the remainder of the 2012-2013 season, Héctor spent most of his playing appearances with Porto's B team. After 10 appearances, on 23 February 2013, Quiñones made his first performance, for Porto's first team. It was a game against Rio Ave, which Porto won by 2-0. Despite making only one appearance for the 2012-13 season, Porto went on to win the league title.

F.C. Penafiel (loan)
Hector went to newly promoted Penafiel for a one-season length loan for the 2014-15 season in Portugal. On 13 December 2014, Quiñones scored his first league goal for Penafiel in a 2-1 win over C.D. Nacional.

International 
He was a member of the Colombia national under-17 football team that finished 4th place at the 2009 edition of the U-17 FIFA World Cup. After successful performance representing Colombia, he took part in the 2011 Toulon Tournament representing the Colombia national under-20 football team. He scored his first goal against Italy in a 1-1 draw, during the group stages and eventually won the Tournament with Colombia.

He also took part  at the 2011 U-20 FIFA World Cup that was held in Colombia.

Hector was called up to represent Colombia during the 2014 FIFA World Cup qualification against Bolivia and Venezuela. However, he suffered an injury and missed his call up.

Honors

Club
Deporto Cali
Copa Colombia (1): 2010
Porto
Primeira Liga (1): 2012-13
Porto B
Segunda Liga (1): 2013-14

Country
U-20 Colombia
Toulon Tournament (1): 2011

References

External links 
 Official Website

1992 births
Living people
Colombian footballers
Colombia youth international footballers
Colombia under-20 international footballers
Colombian expatriate footballers
Categoría Primera A players
Primeira Liga players
Liga Portugal 2 players
Deportivo Cali footballers
Atlético Junior footballers
FC Porto players
FC Porto B players
F.C. Penafiel players
Millonarios F.C. players
F.C. Paços de Ferreira players
América de Cali footballers
Colombian expatriate sportspeople in Portugal
Expatriate footballers in Portugal
Association football fullbacks
Footballers from Cali